Cheq Wong (Ceq Wong, Chewong) is an Austroasiatic language spoken in the Malay Peninsula by the Cheq Wong people. It belongs to the Northern subbranch of the Aslian languages. Northern Aslian was labelled Jehaic in the past.

References

Further reading

 Howell, S. (1982). Chewong myths and legends. Kuala Lumpur: Printed for the Council of the M.B.R.A.S. by Art Printing Works.
 Howell, S. (1984). Society and cosmos: Chewong of peninsular Malaysia. Singapore: Oxford University Press.
 Kruspe, N. (2009). "Loanwords in Ceq Wong, an Austroasiatic language of Peninsular Malaysia". In: Haspelmath, Martin and Uri Tadmor (eds.). Loanwords in the world’s languages: a comparative handbook of lexical borrowing. Berlin: Mouton de Gruyter. pp. 659-685.
 Kruspe, N., N. Burenhult & E. Wnuk. (2014). "Northern Aslian". In: P. Sidwell & M. Jenny (eds.). The Handbook of Austroasiatic languages. Brill Publishers. pp. 419-474.

External links
Kruspe, N. (2009). Ceq Wong vocabulary. In: Haspelmath, Martin & Tadmor, Uri (eds.) World Loanword Database (WOLD). Munich: Max Planck Digital Library
http://projekt.ht.lu.se/rwaai RWAAI (Repository and Workspace for Austroasiatic Intangible Heritage)
http://hdl.handle.net/10050/00-0000-0000-0003-6702-D@view Ceq Wong in RWAAI Digital Archive
ELAR archive of Ceq Wong (and Mah Meri) language documentation materials

Languages of Malaysia
Aslian languages